Longshot is a 2001 American comedy film directed by Lionel C. Martin, and written by Lou Pearlman, as a promotional tool to promote the acting debuts of his succession of successful boybands and girl groups, such as NSYNC, O-Town and Natural, as well as singer Britney Spears, girlband Innosense and pop-hip hop trio LFO, all of whom had cameo appearances in the film, as Pearlman had worked with all of them during the late 1990s and early 2000s. Hunter Tylo, Paul Sorvino Antonio Sabato Jr., Zachery Ty Bryan, and Kenny Rogers star in the film and Spears has a cameo.

The plot recounts the tale of a young boy, Alex Taylor, who gets caught up in his brother's activities as a gigolo, and uses each of the said pop acts as a tool within the film.

Plot
Alex Taylor lives in Los Angeles with his older brother, Jack, who works as a personal fitness trainer and sometime gigolo. Alex's classmates begin to harass him after he misses the game-winning shot at the end of one of his high school's basketball games. Meanwhile, Laszlo Pryce, a rich and corrupt businessman, discovers Jack's affair with his wife (Mitzi Martin). Laszlo threatens to kill Jack and Alex unless Jack travels to New York City to seduce a widow named Rachel Montgomery. On the verge of selling her company, Laszlo wants Jack to relay any inside information he can discover about the impending transaction. Fearing for his younger brother's life, Jack brings Alex with him on the trip. The con begins to unravel when Rachel and Jack fall for each other while Alex similarly falls for Rachel's daughter, Kelly. Jack reveals to Rachel why he's in New York, and the two conspire to expose Pryce. Rachel, though, needs to raise two million dollars to save her company. In a stroke of luck, Alex wins a contest to shoot a halftime, half-court shot. He makes it, Rachel keeps her company, Laszlo is arrested, and everyone lives happily ever after.

Cast
 Tony DeCamillis as Jack Taylor
 Hunter Tylo as Rachel Montgomery
 Joey Sculthorpe as Alex Taylor
 Paul Sorvino as Laszlo Pryce
 Antonio Sabato Jr. as Tommy Sutton
 Jessica Wesson as Kelly Montgomery
 Tara Davis as Vicky Thompson
 Gilbert Gottfried as Mr. Chadwick
 Ellen Albertini Dow as Mrs. Fleisher
 Zachery Ty Bryan as Deke
 Danielle Fishel as Gloria
 Jeremy Wieand as Chip
 Louis J. Pearlman as Captain Lewis
 Mitzi Martin as Mrs. Pryce
 Colin Bain as Hundel
 NSYNC
 Britney Spears as Flight Attendant
 Kenny Rogers as Pilot
 Harry "K.C." Wayne Casey as Co-Pilot
 Darrin Dewitt Henson as Male Flight Attendant
 Dwayne Johnson as The Mugger
 O-Town
 LFO
 Innosense
 Take 5
 C-Note
 Kevin Eubanks as Jazz Club Performer
 Marvin "Smitty" Smith as Jazz Club Performer
 Charnett Moffett as Jazz Club Performer
 Full Force
 Michael Tylo as CEO
 Dustin Diamond as Waiter
 Jermaine Jackson as himself
 Kelly Rutherford as herself
 Traci Bingham as herself
 Lark Voorhies as herself
 Marc Piacenza as himself
 Mark Breland as himself
 Art Garfunkel as himself
 Kim Garfunkel as herself
 James Garfunkel as himself
 Stacey Murray as herself
 Jerod Mixon as himself
 Jamal Mixon as himself
 Yolanda "Yo-Yo" Whittaker as herself
 Chick Hearn as Announcer
 Robert "Kool" Bell as Announcer
 JoJo Wright as Announcer
 Cubby Bryant as Stock Reporter
 Brett Rice as Older Valet
 Lynn Harless as Country Club Patron
 Ron Yuan as Friend #4
 Carrie Stevens as Waitress
 Joel Redlin as Chippendales Usher

Soundtrack
The soundtrack to the film was released on March 5, 2002, via Transcontinental Records. The album features brand new recordings from NSYNC and O-Town especially for the film.

 "Feel the Love" - NSYNC
 "Me (Boom Shelak, Lak, Boom)" - LFO
 "See You Again" - O-Town
 "Put Your Arms Around Me" - Natural
 "Let's Get this Party Started" - Take 5
 "Wishing on Every Star" - Innosense
 "So Often" - C-Note
 "It Don't Bother Me" - Brizz
 "She's a Mystery" - Becker
 "In and Out" - Ali Dee
 "I Just Wanna (Be with You)" - Bon Voyage
 "Happy" - Keli Michaels
 "Fall in Love" - Nicole Carter
 "A Reason to Love Me" - Joey Sculthorpe
 "Longshot Theme" - Lalo Schifrin
 "Longshot Theme" (Remix) - Lalo Schifrin
 "Comatose" and "All Around" - Jaymeer were used in the chase scene.

Production
About one-third of the film was service-produced in Toronto, which doubled up as New York City within the film, under contract with The Danforth Studios Ltd, a subsidiary of SpaceWorks Entertainment Inc. The film was a complete commercial failure, taking in nowhere near the $20 million it cost to film at the box office. The film was also panned by critics, who claimed that many of the pop acts who appeared in the film later claimed to have only appeared due to the amount of pay they would receive for a cameo appearance.

Reception

Release
Longshot was released in theatres on October 25, 2001 in Germany, where all of Pearlman's boybands had enjoyed success long before their international debuts. It was never released to theaters in United States, instead being shown on the Disney Channel as a television movie, and later released on March 26, 2002 on video and DVD as a home entertainment release. The film was also packaged with copies of Crossroads, a film which starred Spears, in selected FYE stores in the United States. The film was released on VHS and DVD on March 26, 2002, by Spartan Home Entertainment.

References

Notes
  Members of NSYNC: Justin Timberlake as Valet, Joseph Fatone as Pizza Chef, Joshua Chasez as Pizza Chef, Christopher Kirkpatrick as Patron, and Lance Bass as Flight Engineer
  Members of O-Town: Ashley Parker Angel, Daniel Miller, Erik Estrada, Trevor Penick, and Jacob Underwood
  Members of LFO: Brad Fischetti, Rich Cronin, Devin Lima, and Brian 'Brizz' Gillis
  Members of Innosense: Nikki Deloach, Veronica Lee Finn, Mandy Ashford, Danay Ferrer, and Jenny Morris
  Members of Take 5: Ryan Goodell, Jeffrey 'Clay' Goodell, Stevie Sculthorpe, Timothy 'T.J.' Christofore, and Tilky Jones
  Members of C-Note: Jose 'Brody' Martinez, David Pérez, Andrew Rogers, and Raúl Molina
  Members of Full Force: Lou George, Paul A. George, Brian George, Curtis Bedeau, Hugh Clarke, and Gerard Charles

Citations

External links
 
 
 
 

2001 films
American teen films
American teen comedy films
Films scored by Lalo Schifrin
Lou Pearlman
2000s English-language films
2000s American films